Edmund Sardinson Carter (3 February 1845 – 23 May 1923) was an English first-class cricketer, who played for Oxford University, Victoria and Yorkshire.

Born in Malton, Yorkshire, the son of the rector of Slingsby, Yorkshire, he was educated at Durham School, for whom he played from 1861 to 1864, captaining the team for his last two years. He attended Worcester College, Oxford, playing for the University eleven from 1865 to 1868 and gaining his blue in 1866 and 1867. He also rowed in the University eight, gaining blues in 1867 and 1868.  He travelled to Australia in an effort to recover from pleurisy, and played one first-class game for Victoria while there. Carter made his highest score of 63 in this game, on debut, against New South Wales.  Between 1876 and 1881, he played in fourteen matches for Yorkshire. His final first-class outing was for I Zingari in 1882.  He followed his father into the church, becoming a curate and rector and a composer of hymns and church music.

A right-handed batsman, he scored 503 runs at 13.59 and, bowling underarm and right arm fast roundarm, he took 39 wickets with a best of 4 for 58 against the Marylebone Cricket Club (MCC). Carter also took 17 catches.

As a boy he played for the Langton Wold Cricket Club, later known as the Vale of Derwent Cricket Club and, in 1864, joined the Yorkshire Gentlemen. He was appointed curate of Christ Church, Ealing and helped to form the Ealing Cricket Club with Tom Hearne. He took 9–0 for Ealing against Willesden Cricket Club in 1874.

He became vicar of St. Michael-Le-Belfry in York in 1882 and later a Vicar Choral and the Sub-Chanter of York Minster, and continued to play for the Yorkshire Gentlemen up to 1900. Carter invited Lord Hawke to play for Yorkshire, and also introduced Ted Peate to the county. Carter served on the Yorkshire committee for many years.

He died aged 78, in May 1923 in Scarborough, North Yorkshire, England.  His brother, Arthur Carter, also played one game of first-class cricket for the MCC.

References

External links
Cricinfo Profile
Cricket Archive Statistics

1845 births
1923 deaths
Yorkshire cricketers
People educated at Durham School
Alumni of Worcester College, Oxford
Victoria cricketers
People from Malton, North Yorkshire
Oxford University cricketers
Oxford University Boat Club rowers
I Zingari cricketers
English cricketers
Gentlemen of the North cricketers
Cricketers from Yorkshire
Melbourne Cricket Club cricketers